The Alex Ekwueme Federal University Ndufu Alike Ikwo (AE-FUNAI) is a  Nigerian higher institution located in Ndufu, Alike Ikwo of Ebonyi State. It was established in 2011. It was formally called Federal University Ndufu Alike Ikwo until February 2nd , 2018 when it  renamed by the Federal Government after the late civilian Vice President of Nigeria, Dr. Alex Ekwueme. The University sits on a land mass of  438 hectares . The University has 10, 000 and 2, 230 students and staff population respectively.

Organisation

The University has 11 Faculties and a college:
Agriculture
Basic Medical Sciences
Education
Engineering and Technology
Humanities
Management Sciences
Social Sciences
Biological Sciences
Environmental Sciences
College of Medicine
Physical Sciences
Law

The University Library 
The University Library was founded in 2012, not long after the University was founded in 2011. The university's three primary focuses—teaching/learning, research, and community services—are apparently supported by the library.

The primary aims of the library 
The primary aims of the library are to:
 Establish fully ICT-driven library services by adopting the application of information technology to all library operations

 Make sure to build a solid library of resources using reliable information sources.

 Create and maintain a strong electronic library on the Virtual Learning Environment platform (VLE).

 Provide a suitable environment for learning and research purposes.

 Make sure the sources are current, pertinent, and, most essential, have a significant impact on the university's programmes.

 Provide staff and students sufficient access to the collection and ensure that they make the most of the information sources available.

 Manage the resources effectively for the University's benefit.
 offer auxiliary services to the university population.

The Library Structure 
The University Librarian oversees the University Library as it currently stands. There are five departments: Readers' Services, Cataloguing and Book Processing, Serials Management, Acquisitions and Gifts, and the Library Systems Development Unit. The departments in charge of acquisitions and serials management are primarily in charge of collection development (books and journals in print format only). The cataloguing department is responsible for cataloging and classifying new materials . The Readers' Services Department manages the programs and activities that library patrons engage in, such as book borrowing, reference services, reserved book services, etc., while the Systems Development Department is in charge of managing the library's automation and computerization systems as well as its electronic resource management.

Library Services 

 The library services include:

 Lending books to both staff and students

 E-library services

 Inter-library loan services

 Book Reservation

 Reference services etc.

See also
Education in Nigeria

References

External links
http://www.funai.edu.ng

Education in Ebonyi State
 
Educational institutions established in 2011
2011 establishments in Nigeria
Federal universities of Nigeria